This is a list in alphabetical order of Namibian cricketers who have played first-class cricket. Prior to 1915, what is today Namibia was German South West Africa, a German colony. Cricket was recorded as being played in German South West Africa prior to the First World War, and later during the war by occupying South African troops. When the former colony was incorporated into South Africa following the war, cricket grew in popularity. What was the Territory of South West Africa gained independence from South Africa in 1990, with a Namibian cricket team having been formed in 1989. The national team first played first-class cricket in the 2004 Intercontinental Cup against Uganda at Windhoek. In the 2006-07 South African cricket season, Namibia were added to the CSA 3-Day Cup, the second tier of first-class cricket in South Africa; this arrangement lasted until 2018, when Namibia withdrew citing issues around costs and logistics. The team continued to play first-class cricket in the Intercontinental Cup until its discontinuation of the Intercontinental Cup in 2017. Namibia played a total of 155 first-class matches between 2004 and 2018.

The details are the player's usual name followed by the years in which he was active as a first-class player and then his name is given as it would appear on modern match scorecards. Note that many players represented other first-class teams besides Namibia. Players are shown to the end of the 2021–22 season.

A
 Stephanus Ackermann (2008/09–2011) : S. T. Ackermann
 Nasimabe Ambambi (2009–10) : N. E. Ambambi

B

C
 Gareth Cloete (2007–08) : G. W. Cloete
 Vernon Cloete (2013/14–2014–15) : V. R. Cloete
 Fritz Coetzee (2016/17–2017–18) : F. Coetzee
 Christopher Coombe (2011/12–2017–18) : C. W. Coombe
 Norman Curry (1973–74) : N. O. Curry

D
 Jason Davidson (2012/13–2013–14) : J. Davidson
 Niko Davin (2017–18) : N. Davin
 Kobus Delport (2011–12) : K. Delport
 Marius Delport (2013–2015–16) : M. P. Delport
 Gert Dippenaar (2011–12) : G. J. Dippenaar
 Michau du Preez (2013/14–2017–18) : M. D. du Preez
 Michael Durant (2007–08) : M. Durant

E
 Andre Engelbrecht (2011–12) : E. Engelbrecht
 Gerhard Erasmus (2011–2017–18) : M. G. Erasmus

F
 Jacques Fourie (2016–17) : J. Fourie
 Glenn Foxcroft (2010/11–2011–12) G. Foxcroft
 Jan Frylinck (2010/11-2015–16) : J. N. Frylinck

G
 Hendrik Geldenhuys (2007/08–2012–13) : H. W. Geldenhuys
 Zane Green (2013/14–2017–18) : Z. E. Green
 Shalako Groenewald 2012/13–2013–14) : S. Groenewald
 Willem Groenewald (2009/10–2010–11) : W. J. Groenewald
 Zhivago Groenewald (2010/11–2016–17) : Z. Groenewald
 Pieter Grove (2007/08–2012–13) : P. J. Grove

H
 Robert Herridge (2014/15–2015–16) : R. J. Herridge

K
 Morné Karg (2005) : M. Karg
 Daniel Keulder (2003/04–2005) : D. Keulder
 Louis Klazinga (2006/07–2013–14)) : L. Klazinga
 Bjorn Kotze (2005–2010–11) : B. L. Kotze
 Jean-Pierre Kotze (2012/13–2017–18) : J–P. Kotze
 Malan Kruger (2014–15) : M. B. Kruger

L

M
 Hendrik Marx (2008–09) : H. J. Marx
 Mika Mutumbe (2012/13–2016–17) : M. Mutumbe
 Wessel Myburgh (2009/10–2010–11) : W. Myburgh

N
 Mauritius Ngupita (2017–18) : M. V. Ngupita

O
 Ian Opperman (2011/12–2012–13) : I. Opperman

P
 Colin Peake (2016/17–2017–18) : C. J. Peake
 Xander Pitchers (2012/13–2016–17) : R. A. H. Pitchers
 Henno Prinsloo (2006–2006–07) : H. Prinsloo

R
 Wayne Raw (2012–13) : W. Raw
 Neil Rossouw (2004/05–2011–12) : N. Rossouw
 Pieter Rossouw (2009/10–2011–12) : P. Rossouw

S

V

W
 Riaan Walters (2003/04–2008–09) : R. Walters
 Bredell Wessels (2011/12–2015–16) : J. B. Wessels
 David Wiese (2005/06–2020) : D. Wiese
 Craig Williams (2007/08–2017–18) : G. G. Williams

Y
 Pikky Ya France (2010/11–2017–18) : H. N. Ya France
 Kenneth Yates (1961) : K. C. Yates

References

Cricket in Namibia
H